Sphaeromias longipennis is a species of biting midges, insects in the family Ceratopogonidae.

References

Further reading

External links

 

Ceratopogonidae